Euprotomus is a genus of sea snails, marine gastropod mollusks in the family Strombidae, the true conchs.

Species
Species within the genus Euprotomus include:
Euprotomus aratrum (Röding, 1798)
Euprotomus aurisdianae (Linnaeus, 1758)
Euprotomus aurora Kronenberg, 2002
Euprotomus bulla (Röding, 1798)
Euprotomus chrysostomus (Kuroda, 1942)
Euprotomus hawaiensis (Pilsbry, 1917, "1918")
Euprotomus hirasei (Kuroda, 1942)
Euprotomus iredalei (Abbott, 1960)
Euprotomus vomer (Röding, 1798)
Species brought into synonymy
Euprotomus donnellyi Iredale, 1931: synonym of Euprotomus vomer (Röding, 1798)
Euprotomus kiwi (Bozzetti, L. & D.M. Sargent, 2011): synonym of Euprotomus vomer (Röding, 1798)

References

 Liverani V. (2014) The superfamily Stromboidea. Addenda and corrigenda. In: G.T. Poppe, K. Groh & C. Renker (eds), A conchological iconography. pp. 1–54, pls 131–164. Harxheim: Conchbooks

External links
 Gill T. (1870). On the Pterocerae of Lamarck, and their mutual relations. American Journal of Conchology. 5(3): 120-139
 Mörch O.A.L. (1852). Catalogus conchyliorum quae reliquit D. Alphonso D’Aguirra & Gadea, Comes de Yoldi 1, Cephalophora. L. Klein, Hafniae [Copenhagen], 170 pp

Strombidae
Gastropod genera